Bohon may refer to:

Bahon, Haiti
Bahon, Iran
Bohon, Mali
A former medieval manor named Bohon (or Bohun), on the Cotentin Peninsula of Normandy, France, and surviving in:
Saint-André-de-Bohon
Saint-Georges-de-Bohon